Robert Hindmarch may refer to:

 Bob Hindmarch (born 1930), Canadian professor and ice hockey coach
 Rob Hindmarch (1961–2002), English footballer